{{DISPLAYTITLE:C20H23NO3}}
The molecular formula C20H23NO3 (molar mass: 325.408 g/mol) may refer to:

 6,14-Endoethenotetrahydrooripavine
 Enpiperate
 N-Methyl-3-piperidyl benzilate
 Nalodeine

Molecular formulas